CD83 (Cluster of Differentiation 83) is a human protein encoded by the  gene.

Structure 
The membrane-bound form of CD83 consists of an extracellular V-type immunoglobulin-like domain, a transmembrane domain and a cytoplasmic signaling tail. A free soluble form consists of the immunoglobulin-like domain alone. Membrane-bound CD83 is expected to form trimers. Soluble CD83 is able to assemble into dodecameric complexes.

Gene 
The CD83 gene is located on human chromosome 6p23 and mouse chromosome 13. In humans, a promoter 261 bp upstream consists of five NF-κB and three interferon regulatory factor binding sites, reflecting the involvement of CD83 in inflammation, as well as binding sites for the aryl hydrocarbon receptor. The latter also occur in an enhancer sequence located 185 bp downstream, inside the second intron, and may suggest negative regulation of transcription by microbial metabolites produced in the gut.

Function 
The transmembrane domain of membrane-bound CD83 stabilizes MHC II, costimulatory molecules and CD28 in the membrane by antagonizing MARCH-family E3 ubiquitin ligases.

Ligands 
It is not clear what ligands interact with CD83, but membrane-bound CD83 may homotypically interact with the soluble form, suggesting autocrine immune regulation. However, it contrasts with differences between the single expression of soluble CD83 on monocytes and membrane-bound CD83 on activated dendritic cells seems also as their good marker. Soluble CD83 also binds to CD154, leading to T helper type 2 lymphocyte apoptosis by suppression of Bcl-2 inhibitors.

Positive selection 
The development of thymocytes during the positive-selection stage may be guided by CD83 expression on cortical thymic epithelial cells (cTECs). CD4+CD8+ double-positive thymocytes surrounded by specially differentiated cTECs called thymic nurse cells are tested for function of their αβ T cell receptor (TCR); a nonreactive TCR leads to thymocyte death by neglect. Successful rearrangement of a reactive TCR supports survival and restriction of expression to CD4 or CD8 alone on single-positive thymocytes, depending on the ability to recognize MHC II or MHC I, respectively. Upregulation of MHC II turnover on thymic nurse cells by CD83 may enlarge the population of CD4+ single-positive thymocytes.

Regulatory T cells 

T regulatory cells (Treg cells) are present in two major populations: thymically induced and peripherally induced Treg cells. All Treg cells express the Foxp3 transcription factor, establishing their suppressive phenotype. Foxp3 expression is not affected by loss of CD83 in a CD83 knockout mouse. In contrast, CD83 seems important for peripheral Treg cell induction, as suggested by reduction of this population in a conditional knockout mouse lacking CD83 specifically in Treg cells, which results in a proinflammatory phenotype. 

CD83 deficiency also results in an imbalances in effector function of Treg cells, as decreased expression of the T helper type 2 cell transcription factor GATA3 is also important for ST2 production.

Activated Treg cells produce large amounts of soluble CD83, leading to downregulation of IRAK-1 at inflamed sites, downregulation of toll-like receptor signaling, and switching of inflammatory signals to tolerance establishment.

Dendritic cells 
CD83 expression is a marker for mature dendritic cells. CD83 stabilizes MHC II on membrane by antagonizing MARCH E3 ubiquitin ligases. A MARCH1 knockout mouse shows accumulation of MHC II, which leads to reduced CD4+ T lymphocyte activation and reduced IL-12 production. Conversely, a CD83 knockout mouse shows a reduction of MHC II and CD86, better response to bacterial infection, and higher production of IL-12 than in the wild type. CD83 seems to be an important regulator of dendritic cell phenotype and MHC II turnover, mediated by CD83-dependent endosome processing.

B cells 
CD83 expression correlates with rate of activation of B lymphocytes and it is under control of the B cell receptor, CD40, or Toll-like receptor activation, as in other lymphocytes, where CD83 is expressed upon stimulation. A CD83 knockout mouse shows upregulated proliferation of B lymphocytes, suggesting that CD83 acts as a brake on proliferation. CD83 does not affect affinity maturation of antibodies, but its deficiency enhances immunoglobulin E class switching, suggesting that CD83 may be involved in allergy development and could be a therapeutic target for allergy treatment.

See also 
 Cluster of differentiation

References

Further reading

External links 
 
 

Clusters of differentiation